The Herbrand Award for Distinguished Contributions to Automated Reasoning is an award given by the Conference on Automated Deduction (CADE), Inc., (although it predates the formal incorporation of CADE) to honour persons or groups for important contributions to the field of automated deduction. The award is named after the French scientist Jacques Herbrand and given at most once per CADE or International Joint Conference on Automated Reasoning (IJCAR). It comes with a prize of US$1,000. Anyone can be nominated, the award is awarded after a vote among CADE trustees and former recipients, usually with input from the CADE/IJCAR programme committee.

Recipients
Past award recipients are:

1990s
 Larry Wos (1992) 
 Woody Bledsoe (1994) 
 John Alan Robinson (1996) 
 Wu Wenjun (1997) 
 Gérard Huet (1998) 
 Robert S. Boyer and J Strother Moore (1999)

2000s
 William W. McCune (2000) 
 Donald W. Loveland (2001) 
 Mark E. Stickel (2002).
 Peter B. Andrews (2003) 
 Harald Ganzinger (2004)
 Martin Davis (2005)
 Wolfgang Bibel (2006)
 Alan Bundy (2007)
 Edmund M. Clarke (2008)
 Deepak Kapur (2009)

2010s
 David Plaisted (2010)
 Nachum Dershowitz (2011)
 Melvin Fitting (2012)
 C. Greg Nelson (2013)
 Robert L. Constable (2014)
 Andrei Voronkov (2015)
 Zohar Manna and Richard Waldinger (2016)
 Lawrence C. Paulson (2017)
 Bruno Buchberger (2018)
 Nikolaj Bjørner and Leonardo de Moura (2019)

2020s
 Franz Baader (2020)
 Tobias Nipkow (2021)
 Natarajan Shankar (2022)

See also 
 List of computer science awards
 Jacques Herbrand Prize — by the French Academy of Sciences, for mathematics and physics

External links
 The Herbrand Award for Distinguished Contributions to Automated Reasoning

Computer science awards
Logic in computer science